Kalach-na-Donu, or Kalach-on-the-Don, is a town and the administrative center of Kalachyovsky District in Volgograd Oblast, Russia, located on the Don River,  west of Volgograd, the administrative center of the oblast. Population:

History
It was founded in 1708 as a Cossack sloboda and was originally called Kalach.

In World War II, the town lent its name to an armored clash between the German 6th Army and the Soviet 64th and 1st Tank Armies from July 25 to August 11, 1942. About three months later, during Operation Uranus, several Soviet tank corps encircled the besieging German 6th Army in Stalingrad by capturing Kalach, thus cutting off German supply routes.

It was granted town status on April 18, 1951. At the same time, its name was changed to Kalach-na-Donu, to distinguish it from an eponymous town in Voronezh Oblast.
By Construction of Volga–Don Canal in 1952, The city become the end point of the canal.

Administrative and municipal status
Within the framework of administrative divisions, Kalach-na-Donu serves as the administrative center of Kalachyovsky District. As an administrative division, it is, together with the settlement of Dom otdykha, incorporated within Kalachyovsky District as the town of district significance of Kalach-na-Donu. As a municipal division, the town of district significance of Kalach-na-Donu is incorporated within Kalachyovsky Municipal District as Kalachevskoye Urban Settlement.

References

Notes

Sources

External links

Official website of Kalach-na-Donu 
Kalach-na-Donu Business Directory 

Cities and towns in Volgograd Oblast
Populated places established in 1708
1708 establishments in Russia
Don Host Oblast